Vichayut Limratanamongkol (born October 18, 1997) is a Thai actor. He started his career at age 18 in the 2015 film สุดแค้นแสนรัก Channel 3 as young Torna, a son of Ampohn and Thotwee. Torna is a step brother of Yongyuth. The upcoming filming is Pradiwaradawhich will be broadcast at Channel 3 and further next will be DuenPradapdao. He is now study at grade 12, Saint Gabriel's College.

Filmography

TV Drama 

 2018 Kahon Maha Ratuek Ep.4 Mr. Phadungsak's murder case (กาหลมหรทึก คดีที่ ๔ ร้านขนมเนื่องนวล) (The One Enterprise/One 31) as Wilad (นายวิลาศ เนื่องนวล) 
 2018 Mister Merman (แฟนฉันเป็นเงือก) (Maker Group/Ch.3) as Plangton (พลสิทธิ์ พิทักษ์ชล (แพลงตอน)) with Namnung Suttidachanai
 2022 Guk Nak Ruk Sa Loey (กั๊กนักรักซะเลย) (Mayom Mahaniyom Production/PPTVHD36) as Kawin Khajornwong (Win) (กวิน ขจรวงศ์ (วิน)) with Manasaporn Chanchalerm
 2022 Sai Lub Lip Gloss (สายลับลิปกลอส) (Broadcast Thai​ Television/Ch.3) as Ped (เป็ด)

Television series
 2015 Wonder Teacher (อัศจรรย์คุณครูเทวดา) (GMMTV/One 31) as Typhoon (ไต้ฝุ่น)
 2016  (ซีรีส์เชือกวิเศษไตรภาค ตอน วันที่เธอหายไป) (th:/GMM 25) as Max, Muy (แม็ก กับ มุ่ย (เล่นเป็นสองคน))
 2017 Love Songs Love Series 2 Ep. (เลิฟซองส์เลิฟซีรีส์ 2 ตอน โปรดส่งใครมารักฉันที) (Keng Kwang Kang/GMM 25) as Taen (แทน)
 2018 My Hero Series Part 3 :Lom Phrai Pook Rak (Cholumpi Productioned/Ch.3) as Piyawat Mettawong
 2021 Remember You (2021) (Remember You คือเธอ) (/True Asian Series, TrueID+ and Netflix) as Anan (อนันต์)

Television sitcom

Film
 2017 You & Me XXX (2017) (You & Me XXX - เมื่อฉันกับเธอ XXX) (Talent 1 Movie Studio) as Pokpong (ปกป้อง) with Jularat Hanrungroj

Music video appearance
 2016 Peun Tee Tup Saun (พื้นที่ทับซ้อน) - Boy Peacemaker (GRAND MUSIK/YouTube:GMM GRAMMY OFFICIAL)

Advertising 
 KFC 
 CARSON

Award of Achievement

References

External links 

 

1997 births
Living people
Vichayut Limratanamongkol
Vichayut Limratanamongkol
Vichayut Limratanamongkol
Vichayut Limratanamongkol
Vichayut Limratanamongkol
Vichayut Limratanamongkol
Vichayut Limratanamongkol
Vichayut Limratanamongkol